The Iveco TurboCity is a class of Italian single-decker buses built between 1989 and 1996 by Iveco. Replacing the Effeuno, they consisted of three variants with different internal arrangement: Iveco 480 for urban services, Iveco 580 for suburban services, and Iveco 680 for interurban services (in 12 m length only). There were chassis only models for the extensive Italian body-building industry available. 

The buses were provided (depending from the sub-manufacturer chosen by the customer) with two different chassis length, (9.5 m,) 10.7 m and 12 m. There was also an articulated version (pusher) with a length of 17.8 m, as well as a trolleybus version with Ansaldo electric equipment.

The bus was in service with numerous public transport companies in Italy, Eastern Europe, Malaysia and Africa.

Iveco tried to sell the TurboCity in right-hand drive variants in the United Kingdom, two demonstrators with Alexander bodies were built followed by a batch of six Wadham Stringer bodied buses built for stock. No operator in the UK ordered any and the single-decker bus Alexander prototype was exported to Singapore for use as a driver trainer. The double-decker bus sat unused at Blythswood Vehicles' Glasgow premises for 18 months before finding its first buyer, it then passed a number of small operators in England until a crash ended its career. Some of them were exported to Malaysia for use by RapidKL.

The 480/580 type was assisted by the Iveco TurboCity-R class (TurboCity-UR 490/590) with a lower floor height of 550 mm.

References

Page with photos and technical details 

Double-decker buses
TurboCity